icebox.tv was an animation company founded in 1999 by Jonathan Collier, Howard Gordon, Rob LaZebnik, Scott Rupp, and Tal Vigderson.  The founders stated that the company was created to capitalize on the inherent "freedom of the medium" which they felt stifled creativity of writers due to the confining restrictions of the studio system and traditional media.

The most noteworthy online animation creations of the company are the controversial animated cartoon Mr. Wong and Queer Duck. Many of the founders such as Rob LaZebnik and Jonathan Collier have written and continue to contribute to write for shows as The Simpsons in traditional media.

The company has paired with Mondo Media in a number of shows.

The original Icebox.com shut down in February 2001 after the company failed to secure additional operating capital. It was reported Icebox.com had been spending upwards of $1.4 million a month prior to its demise.

Later in 2001, the site was re-established as Icebox 2.0, LLC after several company founders bought the assets of the failed original venture, including the icebox.com domain name. The scope of the new company was greatly scaled down from its predecessor.

Many of the animated shorts on the new site were viewable only on a pay-per-view basis. The pay-per-view feature has since been removed, although many episodes of Mr. Wong are not viewable on the site, instead only available for purchase on DVD.

Currently, most of the content from the website is now available via the official YouTube channel, called Icebox.

On June 5, 2018, Icebox.com moved their website to Icebox.tv. The website is currently offline.

Animated features 
Queer Duck
Mr. Wong
Meet the Millers
Hard Drinkin' Lincoln
Poker Night
The Elvis and Jack Nicklaus Mysteries
The Adventures of Jesus and His Brothers
Garbage Island
Senior House
Starship Regulars
Navy Bear
Superhero Roommate
Zombie College
Murry Wilson: Rock 'N' Roll Dad

Film
Queer Duck: The Movie

References

External links
Official Website

Internet properties established in 2000
Websites about animation
American comedy websites
American film websites
Streaming television
Defunct websites
American companies established in 1999